Virgin PLAY S.A. (Formerly Virgin Interactive España S.A.) was a Spanish video game distributor, and later a video game publisher.

History
In 1995, Virgin Interactive Entertainment opened up a Spanish subsidiary known as Virgin Interactive España S.A., who would market and distribute the company's titles (later including Interplay Entertainment, Titus Software and The 3DO Company) in Spain.

On May 14, 2002, Virgin Interactive España SA was purchased from Titus Interactive by Tim Chaney along with former Spanish president and founder Paco Encinas. The branch was then separated from the main Virgin Interactive company, which Titus Software already owned, and due to this sale, the company could keep its own identity as a Virgin brand. On November 1, 2002 the division's name was changed to Virgin PLAY S.A..  Under the new name, Virgin Play signed deals with companies such as Midway Games, Ignition Entertainment and Koch Media which would allow Virgin Play to distribute their games in the Spanish market. Interplay and Titus' games continued to be distributed by the company.

In 2003, Virgin Play announced to release the Korean handheld console, GP32 to Spain, Italy and Portugal in place of Game Park, who went into trading difficulties.

In 2006, Virgin Play announced that they would start self-publishing games. The first title self-published by the company was a game based on the Spanish movie Torrente 3: El Protector, which was the first movie produced in Spain to have a game tie-in released for it. The company would sign a publishing deal with I-Imagine Interactive for the release of Final Armada on the PlayStation 2 and PSP  in April 2007. and later published a tactical shooter for the Nintendo DS called Dead 'n' Furious.

In mid 2007, the company's publishing division was renamed to V.2 Play.

In May 2007, the company signed a deal with DTP Entertainment which would allow the publisher to distribute the company's products in Germany, Austria and Switzerland. The company would sign a similar deal with Koch Media a month later which would allow them to distribute in the United Kingdom.

In June 2007, the company signed a deal with Real Madrid to publish a game based on the football team.

In July 2007, Virgin Play announced they would be opening an office in Lisbon, Portugal in order to expand the market and offer a more personalized treatment to Portuguese companies. The office would be branded under the V.2 Play name.

On March 11, 2008, the company announced they had acquired the rights to produce and distribute a video game based on the animated television series Lola & Virginia.

In May 2008, Playlogic Entertainment and Virgin Play founded a UK joint venture called PlayV, PlayV would bring PC, console and handheld products from both companies to the UK market while also offering PR, marketing and sales solutions to additional partners looking to penetrate the UK retail market. In September 2008, Tim Chaney left Virgin Play and later setup his own gaming platform, called Zattikka in June 2009.

In June 2009, Virgin Play asked a Spanish court for a three-month period to seek a solution with its creditors due to a lack of liquidity. Exactly 3 months later, in September 2009, Virgin Play entered liquidation and ceased all operations.

List of published games

Links

Sources

P
Video game companies established in 2002
Video game companies disestablished in 2009
Defunct video game companies of Spain